The term learner-generated context originated in the suggestion that an educational context might be described as a learner-centric ecology of resources and that a learner generated context is one in which a group of users collaboratively marshall available resources to create an ecology that meets their needs.

There are many discussions about user-generated content (UGC), open educational resources (OER), distributed cognition and communities of practice but, although acknowledging the importance of the learning process, there has been little focus on learner-generated contexts or the impact of new technologies on the role of teacher, learner and institution.

Background
The term learner-generated context (LGC) is grounded in the premise that learning and teaching should not start with the embracing of new technologies, but rather that it is a matter of contextualising the learning first before supporting it with technology. The concept finds its roots in the affordances and potentials of a range of disruptive technologies and practice; web 2.0 and participative media, mobile learning, learning design and learning space design. It is also concerned with related issues in social interactions with technology around roles, expertise, knowledge, pedagogy, accreditation, power, participation and democracy.

The learner-generated context concept is concerned with examining the rapid increase in the variety and availability of resources and tools that enable people to easily create and publish their own materials and to access those created by others, and ways in which this extends the capacity for learning context creation beyond the traditional contexts of, inter alia, teachers, academics, designers and policymakers. It is also a concept which challenges existing pedagogies insofar as it sees a new generation of read/write, participatory technologies as enabling learners to take ownership of both their learning and their actions in the real world and to contribute to the co-design of learning resources. In learner generated contexts, technology is seen to offer new dimensions for active participation and creativity in learning.

Definition
The Learner Generated Contexts Research Group was formed at a workshop in Bath (UK) in March 2007. This interdisciplinary research group based at the London Knowledge Lab defines a learner generated context (LGC) as:

A context created by people interacting together with a common, self- defined or negotiated learning goal. The key aspect of Learner Generated Contexts is that they are generated through the enterprise of those who would previously have been consumers in a context created for them.

Key issues
The emphasis on contexts is key: learning is viewed as a social process occurring across a continuum of contexts, and learning must be "fit for context". The generation of context is characterised as an action on tools where a user actively selects, appropriates and implements learning solutions to meet their own needs. The following key issues emerge from this concept:

 learners as creators not consumers
 learning is facilitated by "agile intermediaries"
 learning moves from regulated practice(s) towards participative collaboration and co-creation
 learner needs participatory control of the learning environment
 environment is physical, social and cognitive
 learning design is purposeful – the 'preferred' and 'best' learning context may not be identical
 co-configuration, co-creation and co-design of learning space allows learners to create their own context
 new and relevant learning contexts are generated by needs and questions arising in social interactions
 PAH continuum – pedagogy (cognitive mode), andragogy (metacognitive mode), heutagogy (epistemic mode)

References

External links
 Learner Generated Contexts Wiki http://learnergeneratedcontexts.pbwiki.com/
 LGC Research Group's page at OpenLearn
 The Evolving Story of LGC- A presentation given by members of the LGC group at OpenLearn07
 A Coincidence of Motivations Leading to Agile Configurations – A presentation given by Fred Garnett at Shock of the Old 7, Oxford, 2008
 LGC Launch – A presentation given at LKL debate no. 1 by founding members of the LGC Group.
 Learner-Generated Contexts: sustainable learning pathways through open content – A paper given at the OU OpenLearn07 conference in Milton Keynes, 2007
 http://hennistalk.blogspot.com/2007/11/openlearn-2007-learner-generated.html

Citizen media
Collective intelligence
Human–computer interaction
Ubiquitous computing